Anti-Corruption Bureau may refer to:

 Anti-Corruption Bureau (Andhra Pradesh), India
 Anti-Corruption Bureau (Argentina)
 Anti-Corruption Bureau (Maharashtra), India
 National Anti-Corruption Bureau of Ukraine